Linda Columbus is an American chemist who is Professor of Chemistry and Molecular Physiology at the University of Virginia. Her research considers the structure-function properties of membrane proteins.

Early life and education 
Columbus was born to young parents, neither of whom were educated beyond high school, and grew up in New Hampshire. Columbus was an undergraduate student at Smith College and moved to the University of California, Los Angeles, for graduate research. Her doctoral research with Prof. Wayne L. Hubbell involved the use of spin labelling to understand the backbone and side chain dynamics of α-helices in the nanosecond regime. After earning her doctorate, Columbus joined The Scripps Research Institute as an NIH research fellow.

Research and career 
In 2013, Columbus joined the University of Virginia as an assistant professor. She was promoted to full professor in 2019. She studies the membrane proteins that comprise around one quarter of a proteome. These membrane proteins are involved with information transfer across lipid bilayers, and are used as drug targets. Columbus investigates the membrane proteins that mediate interactions between hosts and bacterial pathogens. To study the structures of the membrane proteins involved in cellular invasion by bacterial pathogens, Columbus makes use of site-directed spin labelling and nuclear magnetic resonance.

Awards and honors 
 2009 NSF CAREER Award
 2010 Cottrell Scholar Award
 2014 Virginia Outstanding Faculty Award
 2018 Biophysical Society Council

Selected publications

References 

Living people
Smith College alumni
University of California, Los Angeles alumni
20th-century American chemists
21st-century American chemists
American women chemists
University of Virginia faculty
Scientists from New Hampshire
Year of birth missing (living people)
20th-century American women scientists
21st-century American women scientists